Lachesilla sulcata is a species of fateful barklouse in the family Lachesillidae. It is found in Central America and North America.

References

Lachesillidae
Articles created by Qbugbot
Insects described in 1986